New Adventures of a Yankee in King Arthur's Court. Fantasy over Mark Twain's theme is a 1988 Soviet adventure film directed by Viktor Gres and based on American author Mark Twain's 1889 novel A Connecticut Yankee in King Arthur's Court. The screenplay was written by Mikhail Roshchin, and the film was produced by Dovzhenko Film Studio.

Plot summary
A plane crashes in the time of King Arthur. The surviving pilot tries to adapt to this strange new world.

Cast
 Sergey Koltakov as Hank Morgan
 Albert Filozov as King Arthur / Merlin
 Yelena Finogeyeva as Queen Ginevra
 Aleksandr Kaidanovsky as Sir Lancelot
 Anastasiya Vertinskaya as Morgan Le Fay
 Yevgeniy Yevstigneyev as Archbishop
 Evdokiya Germanova as Cindy
 Vladimir Soshalsky as Sagramor
 Vladimir Kashpur
 Mark Gres as Mordraig
 Anatoli Stolbov
 Maria Kapnist
 Francisco Rodríguez
 José Vega
 Valeri Gribov

External links

1988 films
1980s fantasy adventure films
Arthurian films
Films based on A Connecticut Yankee in King Arthur's Court
Films based on fantasy novels
Dovzhenko Film Studios films
Soviet fantasy adventure films
Films about time travel
1980s Russian-language films
Films based on American novels